Allagelena gracilens is a spider species found in Europe and eastward to Central Asia.

See also 
 List of Agelenidae species

References

External links 

Agelenidae
Spiders of Asia
Spiders of Europe
Spiders described in 1841
Taxa named by Carl Ludwig Koch